OS X El Capitan is the twelfth major release of macOS (named OS X at the time of El Capitan's release), Apple Inc.'s desktop and server operating system for Macintosh. It focuses mainly on performance, stability, and security. Following the California location-based naming scheme introduced with OS X Mavericks, El Capitan was named after a rock formation in Yosemite National Park. El Capitan is the final version to be released under the name OS X. OS X El Capitan received far better reviews than Yosemite.

The first beta of OS X El Capitan was released to developers shortly following the WWDC keynote on June 8, 2015. The first public beta was made available on July 9, 2015. There were multiple betas released after the keynote. OS X El Capitan was released to end users on September 30, 2015, as a free upgrade through the Mac App Store.

System requirements
All Macintosh products that can run Mountain Lion, Mavericks, or Yosemite can run El Capitan, although not all of its features will work on older models. For example, Apple notes that the newly available Metal API is available on "all Macs since 2012".

These computers can run El Capitan, provided they have at least 2 GB of RAM, with an exception:

iMac (Mid 2007 or later)
MacBook (Aluminum, Late 2008 or later)
MacBook Air (Late 2008 or later)
MacBook Pro (Mid 2007 or later)
Mac Mini (Early 2009 or later)
Mac Pro (Early 2008 or later)
Xserve (Early 2009)

Of these computers, the following models were equipped with 1 GB RAM as the standard option on the base model when they were shipped originally. They can only run OS X El Capitan if they have at least 2 GB of RAM.
iMac (Mid 2007 - Early 2008)
Mac Mini (Early 2009)

The following computers support features such as Handoff, Instant Hotspot, AirDrop between Mac computers and iOS devices, as well as the new Metal API:
iMac (Late 2012 or later)
MacBook (Early 2015 or later)
MacBook Air (Mid 2012 or later)
MacBook Pro (Mid 2012 or later)
Mac Mini (Late 2012 or later)
Mac Pro (Late 2013)

The upgrade varies in size depending upon which Apple Mac computer it is being installed on; in most scenarios, it will require about 6 GB of disk space.

Features
OS X El Capitan includes features to improve the security, performance, design and usability of OS X. Compared to OS X Yosemite, Apple says that opening PDFs is four times faster, app switching and viewing messages in Mail is twice as fast and launching apps is 40% faster. The maximum amount of memory that could be allocated to the graphics processor has been increased from 1024 MB to 1536 MB on Macs with an Intel HD 4000 GPU. OS X El Capitan supports Metal, Apple's graphics API introduced in iOS 8 to speed up performance in games and professional applications. Apple's typeface San Francisco replaces Helvetica Neue as the system typeface. OS X El Capitan also adopts LibreSSL in replacement of OpenSSL used in previous versions.

Window management

OS X El Capitan introduces new window management features such as creating a full-screen split screen limited to two app windows side by side in full screen by pressing the green button on left upper corner of the window or  keyboard shortcut, then snapping any supported other window to that full screen application. This feature is slightly similar to, although less extensive than, the snap-assist feature in Windows 7 (and later) and several Linux desktop environments, such as GNOME. OS X El Capitan improves Mission Control to incorporate this feature across multiple spaces. It also enables users to spot the pointer more easily by enlarging it by shaking the mouse or swiping a finger back and forth on the trackpad.

Applications

Messages and Mail
OS X El Capitan adds multi-touch gestures to applications like Mail and Messages that allow a user to delete or mark emails or conversations by swiping a finger on a multi-touch device, such as a trackpad. OS X also analyzes the contents of individual emails in Mail and uses the gathered information in other applications, such as Calendar. For example, an invitation in Mail can automatically be added as a Calendar event.

Maps
Apple Maps in El Capitan shows public transit information similar to Maps in iOS 9. This feature was limited to a handful of cities upon launch: Baltimore, Berlin, Chicago, London, Los Angeles, Mexico City, New York City, Paris, Philadelphia, San Francisco, Shanghai, Toronto and Washington D.C.

Notes
The Notes application receives an overhaul, similar to Notes in iOS 9. Both applications have more powerful text-processing capabilities, such as to-do lists (like in the Reminders application), inline webpage previews, photos and videos, digital sketches, map locations and other documents and media types. Notes replaces traditional IMAP-based syncing with iCloud, which offers better end-to-end encryption and faster syncing.

Safari

Safari in El Capitan lets users pin tabs for frequently accessed websites to the tab bar, similar to Firefox and Google Chrome. Users are able to quickly identify and mute tabs that play audio without having to search for individual tabs. Safari supports AirPlay video streaming to an Apple TV without the need to broadcast the entire webpage. Safari extensions are now hosted and signed by Apple as part of the updated Apple Developer program and they received native support for content blocking, allowing developers to block website components (such as advertisements) without JavaScript injection. The app also allows the user to customize the font and background of the Reader mode.

Spotlight
Spotlight is improved with more contextual information such as the weather, stocks, news and sports scores. It is also able to process queries in natural language. For example, users can type "Show me pictures that I took in Yosemite National Park in July 2014" and Spotlight will use that request to bring up the corresponding info. The app can now be resized and moved across the screen.

Photos
Photos introduced editing extensions, which allow Photos to use editing tools from other apps.

System Integrity Protection

OS X El Capitan has a new security feature called System Integrity Protection (SIP, sometimes referred to as "rootless") that protects certain system processes, files and folders from being modified or tampered with by other processes even when executed by the root user or by a user with root privileges (sudo). Apple says that the root user can be a significant risk factor to the system's security, especially on systems with a single user account on which that user is also the administrator. System Integrity Protection is enabled by default, but can be disabled.

Reception

Upon release, OS X El Capitan was met with positive reception from both users and critics, with praise mostly going towards the overall functionality of the new features and improved stability. Dieter Bohn of The Verge awarded the operating system a score of 8.5 out of 10; while Jason Snell of Macworld was also positive, rating it 4.5 out of 5. Many people criticized Apple's native apps for not having improved beyond third-party applications.

Issues
After the 10.11.4 update, many users started reporting that their MacBooks were freezing, requiring a hard reboot. This issue mostly affects Early 2015 MacBook Pro computers, although many others have reported freezes in other models. Several users created videos on YouTube which showed the freezes. Soon after this, Apple released the 10.11.5 update, which contained stability improvements. Apple later acknowledged these problems, recommending their users to update to the last point release.

After the December 13, 2016, release of Security Update 2016–003, users reported problems with the WindowServer process becoming unresponsive, causing the GUI to freeze and sometimes necessitating a hard reboot to fix. In response, on January 17, 2017, Apple released Security Update 2016-003 Supplemental (10.11.6) to fix "a kernel issue that may cause your Mac to occasionally become unresponsive" and at the same time released an updated version of Security Update 2016-003 which includes the fix released in the supplemental. Users who have not previously installed Security Update 2016-003 are advised to install the updated version to reach build 15G1217, while users who have already installed the December 13, 2016 Security Update 2016-003 only need to install the supplemental update.

Release history

Timeline of Mac operating systems

References

External links
 – official site
OS X El Capitan download page at Apple

11
X86-64 operating systems
2015 software
Computer-related introductions in 2015